The Church of All Saints in West Camel, Somerset, England, dates from the late 14th century and has been designated as a Grade I listed building.

There had been a previous wooden church on the site since 995 until around 1100 when it was replaced by a small stone Norman church, which was added to over subsequent centuries. The first church may have been founded by Muchelney Abbey.

The tie-beam roof of the nave dates from the 15th century. The tower holds six bells the oldest of which was cast in the 15th century. The church underwent extensive Victorian restoration in the 1860s.

The parish is part of the Cam Vale benefice within the Bruton and Cary deanery.

See also
 Grade I listed buildings in South Somerset
 List of Somerset towers
 List of ecclesiastical parishes in the Diocese of Bath and Wells

References

External links
 West Camel churches

14th-century church buildings in England
Church of England church buildings in South Somerset
Grade I listed churches in Somerset
Grade I listed buildings in South Somerset